Tulio Alberto Gómez Giraldo (Manizales, Colombia), is a Colombian businessman. He is the founder and owner of supermarket chain Superinter. He is the 21st president and biggest shareholder of Colombian football club América de Cali.

Career 
He founded the supermarket chain Supeinter in Cali in 1990.

In 2014, he bought a few shares in America de Cali, taking his wife's advice. Realizing that he did not have many rights, he bought more and kept 53% of the shares of the club that allowed him to make all the decisions. On 10 May 2016, he became the Chairman of America de Cali.

On 27 November 2016, Tulio Gómez was one of the architects in the rise of América de Cali to the Categoría Primera A of Colombian football, together with the team's coach that year Hernán Torres.

On 16 May 2018, Tulio Gómez announced his retirement as President after an irregular campaign in the 2018 Liga Águila. He declared that he would continue as the team owner.

References

External links
 América de Cali
 Official Tulio Gómez Twitter

People from Manizales
People from Cali
América de Cali presidents
Colombian businesspeople
Living people
Year of birth missing (living people)